Sunchhahari is a Rural municipality located within the Rolpa District of the Lumbini Province of Nepal.
The rural municipality spans  of area, with a total population of 16,034 according to a 2011 Nepal census.

On March 10, 2017, the Government of Nepal restructured the local level bodies into 753 new local level structures.
The previous Jaimakasala, Jailwang, Gam, Siuri, Seram and portion of Phagam VDCs were merged to form Sunchhahari Rural Municipality.
Sunchhahari is divided into 7 wards, with Jaimakasala declared the administrative center of the rural municipality.

Demographics
At the time of the 2011 Nepal census, Sunchhahari Rural Municipality had a population of 16,034. Of these, 50.8% spoke Nepali, 42.7% Magar, 6.1% Kham, 0.3% Gurung and 0.1% other languages as their first language.

In terms of ethnicity/caste,  72.3% were Magar, 15.1% Kami, 7.2% Chhetri, 2.7% Damai/Dholi, 1.4% other Dalit, 0.5% Gurung, 0.3% Hill Brahmin, 0.2% Sarki and 0.3% others.

In terms of religion, 68.4% were Hindu, 25.9% Buddhist, 3.1% Prakriti, 2.2% Christian and 0.4% others.

References

External links
official website of the rural municipality

Rural municipalities in Rolpa District
Rural municipalities of Nepal established in 2017